

Champions

Major League Baseball
National League: Pittsburgh Pirates

American League: Baltimore Orioles

1971 World Series: Pittsburgh (NL) def. Baltimore (AL), 4 games to 3.

Inter-league playoff:  Pittsburgh (NL) declined challenge by Tokyo Yomiuri Giants.
World Series MVP: Roberto Clemente
All-Star Game, July 13 at Tiger Stadium: American League, 6–4; Frank Robinson, MVP

Other champions
Amateur World Series: Cuba
College World Series: USC
Japan Series: Yomiuri Giants over Hankyu Braves (4–1)
Big League World Series: District 44 LL, Cupertino, California
Little League World Series: Tainan, Taiwan
Senior League World Series: La Habra, California
Pan American Games: Cuba over United States
Winter Leagues
1971 Caribbean Series: Tigres del Licey
Dominican Republic League: Tigres del Licey
Mexican Pacific League: Naranjeros de Hermosillo
Puerto Rican League: Cangrejeros de Santurce
Venezuelan League: Tiburones de La Guaira

Awards and honors
Baseball Hall of Fame
Dave Bancroft
Jake Beckley
Chick Hafey
Harry Hooper
Joe Kelley
Rube Marquard
Satchel Paige
George Weiss
Most Valuable Player
Vida Blue (AL)  Oakland Athletics
Joe Torre (NL)  St. Louis Cardinals
Cy Young Award
Vida Blue (AL)  Oakland Athletics
Ferguson Jenkins (NL)  Chicago Cubs
Rookie of the Year
Chris Chambliss (AL)  Cleveland Indians
Earl Williams (NL)  Atlanta Braves
Gold Glove Award
George Scott (1B) (AL)
Davey Johnson (2B) (AL)
Brooks Robinson (3B) (AL)
Mark Belanger (SS) (AL)
Paul Blair (OF) (AL)
Amos Otis (OF) (AL)
Carl Yastrzemski (OF) (AL)
Ray Fosse (C) (AL)
Jim Kaat (P) (AL)
Wes Parker (1B) (NL)
Tommy Helms (2B) (NL)
Doug Rader (3B) (NL)
Bud Harrelson (SS) (NL)
Bobby Bonds (OF) (NL)
Roberto Clemente (OF) (NL)
Willie Davis (OF) (NL)
Johnny Bench (C) (NL)
Bob Gibson (P) (NL)

Statistical leaders

Major league baseball final standings

American League final standings

National League final standings

Events

January–February
January 7 – The ruptured Achilles tendon of Reds centerfielder Bobby Tolan brings an end to two sports seasons. Tolan suffers the injury while playing basketball for the Reds offseason squad. He misses the baseball season because of the injury and the Cincinnati front office orders the basketball team to be disbanded as a result.
January 11 – Tigers pitcher John Hiller suffers a heart attack at age 27. he'll miss this season but will make a remarkable comeback.
January 18 – The Pittsburgh Pirates sign Tony Armas as a free agent.
January 31 – The new Special Veterans Committee selects seven men for enshrinement to the Hall of Fame: former players Dave Bancroft, Jake Beckley, Chick Hafey, Harry Hooper, Joe Kelley, and Rube Marquard, and executive George Weiss.
February 9 – Former Negro leagues pitcher Satchel Paige is nominated for the Hall of Fame. On June 10, the Hall's new Veterans Committee will formally select Paige for induction.
February 10 – The Los Angeles Dodgers acquire pitcher Al Downing from the Milwaukee Brewers in exchange for outfielder Andy Kosco. Downing would later be a part of history as the pitcher who surrendered Hank Aaron's 714th career home run, which broke the all-time record set by Babe Ruth.

March–April
March 6 – Charlie Finley persuaded American League president Joe Cronin to have a preseason game in which a walk was allowed on three pitches rather than four. The Athletics bested the Milwaukee Brewers by a 13–9 tally. Nineteen total walks were issued in the game, and a collective six home runs were hit.
April 5 – The St. Louis Cardinals return first baseman Cecil Cooper to the Boston Red Sox. The Cardinals had selected Cooper in the Rule 5 draft in November 1970.
April 10:
The Philadelphia Phillies defeat the Montreal Expos, 4–1, in the first game played at Philadelphia's Veterans Stadium.
Willie Stargell hits three home runs, including his 200th career homer.
Willie Mays of the San Francisco Giants becomes the first player to hit a home run in each of his team's first four games of a season. The shot comes off Jerry Reuss in the third inning of Giants' 6-4 victory over the St. Louis Cardinals at Busch Memorial Stadium. Mays had also homered in each of the first three games of the season, against the San Diego Padres.
April 16 – The Atlanta Braves sign free agent pitcher Luis Tiant.
April 27 – Hank Aaron becomes the third player in Major League history to hit his 600th home run.

May–June
May 6 – Commissioner Bowie Kuhn signs Major League Baseball to a $72 million television contract with NBC.
May 15 – Billy Williams hits the 300th home run of his career during a 6–4 win over the San Diego Padres at Wrigley Field. The milestone homer was hit off Tom Phoebus.
 Luis Tiant, signed by the Braves just one month earlier, is released by Atlanta. Two days later, he signs with the Boston Red Sox, for whom he'd have multiple 20 win seasons for. 
May 17:
Johnny Bench hits his 100th career home run.
The Cleveland Indians are involved in a bizarre play against the Washington Senators at Robert F. Kennedy Memorial Stadium. The Senators' Tommy McCraw leads off the bottom of the fourth inning with a 140-foot pop fly (some sources say it was 250 feet) into short left-center for what should be an out. Instead, Indians shortstop Jack Heidemann, left fielder John Lowenstein and center fielder Vada Pinson collide into each other going for the ball, which falls amongst the three players. Before the ball can be recovered, McCraw circles the bases for an inside-the-park home run; meanwhile, Heidemann, Lowenstein and Pinson are all injured and have to be replaced. Despite their embarrassing moment, the Indians defeat the Senators 6–3.
May 30 - Willie Mays hit his 638th career run and became the National League All-Time career leader in runs scored with 1,950.
June 3 – Pitcher Ken Holtzman of the Chicago Cubs throws the second no-hitter of his career, victimizing the hosts Cincinnati Reds 1–0. Holtzman scores the only run, unearned, in the third inning, to beat Reds pitcher Gary Nolan.
June 6 – Willie Mays hits his major league-leading 22nd and last career extra-inning home run against Phillies reliever Joe Hoerner.
June 8 – The Major League amateur draft is held. The featured many notable players going in the first round: Burt Hooton went to the Chicago Cubs, Jim Rice, went to the Boston Red Sox, Frank Tanana went to the California Angels, while George Brett went to the Kansas City Royals and Mike Schmidt went to the Philadelphia Phillies in the second round. 
June 23 – In a singular performance, pitcher Rick Wise of the Philadelphia Phillies no-hits the Cincinnati Reds, 4–0, and bangs two home runs in the game. Wise joins Wes Ferrell, Jim Tobin and Earl Wilson as the only pitchers to pitch a no-hitter and hit a home run in the same game. It is the second no-hitter against Cincinnati this month, both in Riverfront Stadium.
June 25 – Willie Stargell of the Pittsburgh Pirates hits what will be the longest home run ever hit at Veterans Stadium. In the second inning of the Pirates' 14–4 victory over the Philadelphia Phillies, his shot off Jim Bunning strikes above an exit in the 600 level in the upper deck. The spot where the ball struck will eventually be marked with a yellow star with a black "S" inside a white circle until Stargell's 2001 death, after which the white circle will then be painted black. The star will remain until the stadium's 2004 demolition.
June 29 – The Atlanta Braves release 48 year old pitcher Hoyt Wilhelm. he would later sign with the Los Angeles Dodgers and finish his Hall of Fame career.

July–August
July 7 – Commissioner Kuhn announces that players from the Negro leagues elected to the Hall of Fame will be given full membership in the museum. It had been previously announced that they would be honored in a separate wing.
July 9:
The Oakland Athletics beat the California Angels 1–0 in 20 innings – the longest shutout in American League history. Vida Blue strikes out 17 batters in 11 innings for Oakland, while the Angels' Billy Cowan ties a major league record by fanning six times. Both teams combine for 43 strikeouts, a new major league record.
Kansas City Royals shortstop Freddie Patek hits for the cycle in the Royals' 6–3 victory over the Minnesota Twins at Metropolitan Stadium.
July 13 – In an All-Star Game featuring home runs by future Hall of Famers Hank Aaron, Johnny Bench, Roberto Clemente, Reggie Jackson, Harmon Killebrew and Frank Robinson, the American League triumphs over the National League 6–4 at Tiger Stadium. It is the only AL All-Star victory between 1962 and 1983. Jackson's home run goes 520 feet, and Robinson is named MVP.
August 4:
In Texas League action, Tom Walker pitched a 15-inning no-hitter for the Dallas-Fort Worth Spurs to beat the Albuquerque Dodgers, 1–0, which is considered the second longest no-hitter pitched in American professional baseball history. Walker struck out 11 batters and walked four to complete the gem. His manager Cal Ripken, Sr. left him in the game until he finally picked the victory after throwing 176 pitches.
St. Louis Cardinals pitcher Bob Gibson wins his 200th game, a 7–2 victory over the San Francisco Giants at St. Louis.
August 7: Ken Boswell belted his first career grand slam home run and a run-scoring double as the New York Mets exploded for 21 hits and crushed the Atlanta Braves 20-6. The 20 runs were a Mets record, breaking the mark of 19 set against the Chicago Cubs on May 6,1964.
August 10:
Harmon Killebrew becomes the 10th player to amass 500 home runs, and adds his 501st, but the Orioles beat the Twins 4–3. Mike Cuellar picks up the win.
Sixteen baseball researchers at Cooperstown form the Society for American Baseball Research (SABR), with founder Robert Davids as president.
August 14 – Ten days after his 200th victory, St. Louis Cardinal pitcher Bob Gibson no-hits the Pittsburgh Pirates 11–0, the first no-hitter ever pitched at Three Rivers Stadium. He strikes out 10 batters along the way; three of those are to Willie Stargell, including the final out. The no-hitter is the first to be pitched in Pittsburgh in 64 years; none had been pitched in the 62-year (mid-1909 to mid-1970) history of Three Rivers Stadium's predecessor, Forbes Field.
August 17 – Billy Williams collects the 2,000th hit of his career in a 5–4 loss to the Atlanta Braves in Atlanta.
August 28 – Phillies pitcher Rick Wise hits two home runs, including a grand slam off Don McMahon, in the second game of a doubleheader, duplicating his feat in his June no-hitter. Wise beats the Giants 7–3.

September–October
September 1 – The Pittsburgh Pirates start what is believed to be the first All-Black lineup in major league history, which include several Latin American players, in a 10–7 victory over the Philadelphia Phillies. The lineup: Rennie Stennett (2B); Gene Clines (CF); Roberto Clemente (RF); Willie Stargell (LF); Manny Sanguillén (C); Dave Cash (3B); Al Oliver (1B); Jackie Hernández (SS), and Dock Ellis (P). Another black player, Bob Veale, was one of three relievers in the game.
September 3 – Ron Cey makes his MLB debut, pinching hitter for pitcher Jose Pena in the Dodgers 6-5 win over the Cincinnati Reds. Cey would go on to be the Dodgers regular starting third baseman for the next 12 seasons. 
September 5 – J. R. Richard tied Karl Spooner's major league record by striking out 15 San Francisco Giants in his first major league game, as the Houston Astros beat the Giants.
September 9 – The Chicago Cubs sign Bruce Sutter as an undrafted amateur free agent. 
September 10 – Ferguson Jenkins breaks Charlie Root's Chicago Cubs club record for career strikeouts during an 8–7, 12-inning loss to the Cardinals at Wrigley Field.
September 13 – Baltimore Orioles right fielder Frank Robinson becomes the 11th player to reach 500 career home runs.
September 15 - Larry Yount makes his MLB debut for the Houston Astros, sort of. Yount is injured during warm-ups, causing Astros manager Harry Walker to pull Yount from the game. Yount never appears in another major league game.  
September 22 - At St. Louis' Busch Stadium The Pittsburgh Pirates clinched the National League East title for the second straight year as they beat the Bob Gibson led St. Louis Cardinals, 5-1.
September 24 - At Cleveland's Cleveland Stadium The Baltimore Orioles clinched the American League East title for the third straight year by beating the Cleveland Indians, 7-2 in the first game of a doubleheader. Mike Cuellar picked up the win and it was his 20th victory of 1971.
September 26 – Baltimore Orioles pitcher Jim Palmer shuts out the host Cleveland Indians, 5–0, and becomes the fourth member of the Orioles 1971 pitching staff to notch his 20th victory, joining Dave McNally, Mike Cuellar and Pat Dobson. Only one other team in ML history, the 1920 Chicago White Sox, boasted four 20-game winners.
September 28 – Philadelphia Phillies pitcher Jim Bunning announces his retirement from baseball.
September 29 – The Montreal Expos' Ron Hunt is hit by a pitch for the 50th time of the season.
September 30 – The Washington Senators' lead 7–5 in their last home game, but forfeit the game to the New York Yankees, when, with two outs in the top of the ninth, fans storm the field. The Senators moved to Arlington, Texas, and became the Texas Rangers for the 1972 season.  The Nation's Capital would not have another MLB team until the 2005 relocation of the Montreal Expos, to become the Washington Nationals.
October 17 – Pitcher Steve Blass throws a four-hitter and Roberto Clemente homers as the Pittsburgh Pirates win Game Seven of the World Series over the Baltimore Orioles, 2–1, becoming World Champions for the first time since 1960. Clemente is named the Series MVP. Game Four, played on October 13, was the first night game in World Series history.

November –December
November 2 – Pat Dobson of the Baltimore Orioles pitches a no-hitter against the Yomiuri Giants, winning 2–0. It is the first no-hitter in Japanese-American baseball exhibition history. The Orioles compile a record of 12–2–4 on the tour.
November 10:
Joe Torre of the St. Louis Cardinals, who led the National League in batting average (.363) and runs batted in (137) while hitting 24 home runs, is named the Most Valuable Player over Willie Stargell of the Pittsburgh Pirates (.295/125/48). Torre receives 318 points to 222 for Stargell.
Oakland Athletics pitcher Vida Blue adds the American League MVP Award to his list of awards for 1971, easily outpointing teammate Sal Bando 268–182.
November 14 – In Venezuelan Winter League, Luis Tiant of the Tiburones de la Guaira hurled a 3–0 no-hitter against his former team Leones del Caracas. Tiant became the fourth pitcher in league's 26-year history to achieve the feat, joining Len Yochim (1955), Mel Nelson (1963) and Howie Reed (1968).
November 17 – At age 22, Oakland Athletics pitcher Vida Blue becomes the youngest player ever to win the Most Valuable Player Award and only the fourth to capture both the Cy Young Award and the MVP in the same season.
November 22 – Cleveland Indians first baseman Chris Chambliss receives 11 of 24 first place votes to win the American League Rookie of the Year Award.
November 24 – Catcher-infielder Earl Williams, who hit 33 home runs and 87 RBI for the Atlanta Braves, wins the National League Rookie of the Year honors. Williams gets 18 of 24 first place votes, with the others going to Willie Montañez of the Philadelphia Phillies.
November 29:
The Cincinnati Reds sends 1B Lee May, 2B Tommy Helms and OF Jimmy Stewart to the Houston Astros, in exchange for 2B Joe Morgan, OF César Gerónimo and P Jack Billingham. This trade, criticized in the Cincinnati, Ohio press, will be one of the best in Reds history, and puts the wheels on the big Red Machine, as future Hall of Fame member Morgan will win two MVP awards.
The Chicago Cubs trade P Ken Holtzman to the Oakland Athletics for OF Rick Monday, and the San Francisco Giants deal P Gaylord Perry and SS Frank Duffy to the Cleveland Indians for P Sam McDowell.
November 30 – The Chicago White Sox purchase the contract of Jorge Orta from Mexicali of the Mexican Northern League. 
December 1 – The Chicago Cubs release longtime star and future Hall of Famer Ernie Banks, ending his 19-year major league career. The Cubs also announce that Banks will serve as a coach on manager Leo Durocher's staff in the 1972 season. Mr. Cub finishes his illustrious playing career with 512 home runs and 1,636 RBI.
December 10 – The California Angels send star shortstop Jim Fregosi to the New York Mets in return for four players, one of whom is Nolan Ryan.

Births

January
January 2 – Rick Greene
January 4 – Chris Michalak
January 5 – Jason Bates
January 6 – Eric Moody
January 7 – Frank Menechino
January 7 – Jorge Toca
January 8 – Jason Giambi
January 11 – Alex Delgado
January 11 – Rey Ordóñez
January 12 – Andy Fox
January 13 – Elmer Dessens
January 17 – Tyler Houston
January 19 – Jeff Juden
January 19 – Phil Nevin
January 20 – Brian Giles
January 21 – Johnny Guzmán
January 23 – Charlie Greene
January 24 – Cory Bailey
January 25 – Kerry Taylor
January 27 – Ken Huckaby
January 28 – Kevin Tolar

February
February 3 – Scott Klingenbeck
February 3 – Eric Owens
February 4 – Dennis Konuszewski
February 8 – James Hoye
February 10 – Kevin Sefcik
February 13 – Todd Williams
February 15 – Terry Jones
February 16 – Mike Hubbard
February 17 – Danny Patterson
February 19 – Miguel Batista
February 21 – Jeff Schmidt
February 26 – Matt Luke
February 26 – Danny Perez

March
March 3 – José Oliva
March 4 – Nerio Rodríguez
March 5 – Chad Fonville
March 5 – Jeffrey Hammonds
March 5 – Brian Hunter
March 5 – Brian Lesher
March 5 – José Mercedes
March 6 – Roger Salkeld
March 10 – Bobby Hughes
March 10 – Shad Williams
March 11 – Rod Henderson
March 11 – Lee Sang-hoon
March 12 – Greg Hansell
March 12 – Raúl Mondesí
March 13 – Scott Sullivan
March 17 – Bill Mueller
March 19 – D. T. Cromer
March 20 – Manny Alexander
March 26 – Frank Lankford
March 26 – Jesús Tavárez
March 29 – Sean Lowe

April
April 1 – José Martínez
April 3 – Quilvio Veras
April 5 – Andrés Berumen
April 6 – Lou Merloni
April 7 – Mark Thompson
April 12 – Matt Williams
April 13 – Kevin Ohme
April 14 – Carlos Pérez
April 14 – Gregg Zaun
April 16 – Marc Sagmoen
April 17 – Keith Johnson
April 19 – Sean Whiteside
April 25 – Brad Clontz
April 29 – Sterling Hitchcock
April 30 – Ryan Hawblitzel

May
May 2 – Brent Bowers
May 4 – Joe Borowski
May 4 – Brian Maxcy
May 5 – Mike Redmond
May 8 – Todd Greene
May 10 – Glen Barker
May 11 – Kerry Ligtenberg
May 13 – Mike Sirotka
May 14 – Takashi Kashiwada
May 18 – Rich Garcés
May 21 – Chris Widger
May 22 – Steve Reich
May 23 – Marshall Boze
May 24 – Todd Rizzo
May 25 – Angel Echevarria
May 25 – Sean Maloney
May 26 – Jason Bere
May 31 – José Malavé

June
June 3 – Carl Everett
June 3 – Aaron Ledesma
June 3 – Izzy Molina
June 7 – Roberto Petagine
June 8 – Matt Whisenant
June 12 – Ryan Klesko
June 13 – Jason Thompson
June 16 – Chris Gomez
June 16 – Fernando Hernández
June 22 – Brant Brown
June 22 – Brian Sackinsky
June 22 – Hunter Wendelstedt
June 25 – Michael Tucker
June 26 – Greg Blosser
June 28 – Greg Keagle
June 28 – Ron Mahay

July
July 1 – Jamie Walker
July 2 – Joel Adamson
July 4 – Brendan Donnelly
July 13 – Rich Aude
July 15 – James Baldwin
July 15 – Tim Harikkala
July 19 – Gus Gandarillas
July 19 – Keith Johns
July 20 – Charles Johnson
July 20 – Ray McDavid
July 25 – Billy Wagner
July 27 – Shane Bowers
July 29 – Johnny Ruffin
July 30 – Ron Blazier
July 30 – Calvin Murray

August
August 1 – Travis Driskill
August 2 – Steve Sinclair
August 3 – Chris Sexton
August 5 – Carlos Pulido
August 9 – Scott Karl
August 9 – Ryan Radmanovich
August 9 – Ben Van Ryn
August 10 – Sal Fasano
August 14 – Mark Loretta
August 17 – Jim Converse
August 17 – Jorge Posada
August 18 – Albie López
August 20 – Chris Clapinski
August 21 – Lou Pote
August 22 – Carl Schutz
August 23 – Allen McDill
August 24 – Everett Stull
August 28 – Shane Andrews
August 29 – Henry Blanco
August 29 – Bronson Heflin

September
September 1 – Derek Wallace
September 2 – Rich Aurilia
September 5 – Brian Bevil
September 7 – Sid Roberson
September 9 – Robinson Checo
September 13 – Brent Brede
September 13 – Armando Ríos
September 15 – Jason Hardtke
September 18 – Chris Holt
September 19 – Joey Dawley
September 23 – Willie Greene
September 24 – Jamie Burke
September 24 – Kevin Millar
September 28 – Jamie Brewington
September 29 – Eddy Díaz

October
October 3 – Wil Cordero
October 3 – Tim Hyers
October 4 – Carlos Crawford
October 8 – Joe Ayrault
October 11 – Joe Roa
October 12 – Tony Fiore
October 14 – Midre Cummings
October 15 – Chad Mottola
October 16 – Larry Mitchell
October 25 – Pedro Martínez
October 27 – Scott Forster

November
November 3 – Danny Young
November 4 – Melvin Bunch
November 6 – Bubba Trammell
November 7 – Todd Ritchie
November 9 – Jon Nunnally
November 9 – Scott Sauerbeck
November 10 – Butch Huskey
November 10 – Terry Pearson
November 11 – Roland de la Maza
November 11 – Ryan Hancock
November 15 – Ryan Jackson
November 15 – Todd Steverson
November 17 – Billy McMillon
November 19 – Andy Sheets
November 20 – Kevin Lomon
November 20 – Gabe White
November 21 – John Roper
November 23 – Ryan McGuire
November 23 – Matt Miller
November 23 – Eddie Oropesa
November 23 – Aaron Small
November 25 – Tavo Álvarez
November 27 – Iván Rodríguez
November 28 – Bill Simas
November 30 – Ray Durham
November 30 – Matt Lawton

December
December 6 – José Contreras
December 6 – Adam Hyzdu
December 8 – Garvin Alston
December 9 – Todd Van Poppel
December 11 – Willie Cañate
December 13 – Greg Mullins
December 14 – Eric Ludwick
December 15 – Héctor Ramírez
December 16 – Jeff Granger
December 17 – Bret Hemphill
December 20 – Marc Valdes
December 22 – Jon Ratliff
December 24 – Alex Cabrera
December 26 – Jay Tessmer
December 26 – Carlos Valdéz
December 28 – Benny Agbayani
December 28 – Melvin Nieves
December 30 – Travis Baptist
December 31 – Esteban Loaiza
December 31 – Brian Moehler

Deaths

January
January 1 – Luis Aparicio Sr., 58, legendary Venezuelan shortstop and father of Hall of Famer Luis Aparicio.
January 1 – Joe Lotz, 79, pitcher who worked in 12 games for the 1916 St. Louis Cardinals.
January 1 – Harry Rice, 69, outfielder noted for his defense who also hit .300 five times; played in 1,034 games between 1923 and 1933 for five clubs, principally the St. Louis Browns and Detroit Tigers.
January 7 – Dud Lee, 71, infielder for the St. Louis Browns and Boston Red Sox in the 1920s.
January 7 – Hal Rhyne, 71, shortstop who played from 1926 to 1933 for the Pirates, Red Sox and White Sox.
January 9 – Elmer Flick, 94, Hall of Fame right fielder and lifetime .313 hitter who led AL in triples three times, steals twice, and batting and runs once each.
January 12 – Cy Malis, 63, pitcher who threw 3 innings of relief for the Philadelphia Phillies in his only MLB game, on August 17, 1934.
January 22 – Dorothy Comiskey Rigney, 54, principal owner of the Chicago White Sox from December 10, 1956 to February 7, 1959, when she sold her controlling interest to Bill Veeck.
January 27 – Bruce Connatser, 68, first baseman for 1931–1932 Cleveland Indians; later a longtime scout.
January 31 – Steve Yerkes, 82, second baseman who played in 711 games over seven seasons with the Boston Red Sox, Pittsburgh Rebels of the "outlaw" Federal League, and Chicago Cubs between 1909 and 1916; played all eight games of the 1912 World Series for champion Boston.
January – Bob Clarke, 67 or 68, Negro leagues catcher whose career extended from 1923 to 1948; member, Negro National League 1940 All-Star team.

February
February 8 – Bobby Burke, 64, left-handed pitcher who appeared in 254 MLB games in ten seasons between 1927 and 1937, mostly for the Washington Senators; threw a no-hitter against Boston on August 8, 1931.
February 16 – Cedric Durst, 74, outfielder for the St. Louis Browns, New York Yankees and Boston Red Sox between 1922 and 1930; member of the 1927–1928 world–champion Yankees.
February 18 – Chuck Hostetler, 67, outfielder who appeared in 132 games for the Detroit Tigers after his 40th birthday during the wartime 1944 and 1945 seasons; member of Detroit's 1945 World Series champions.
February 20 – Vidal López, 52, three-time Triple Crown Pitching winner and slugging outfielder who played in the professional leagues of Cuba, México, Puerto Rico and Venezuela, throughout a career that lasted 21 years between the 1930s and 1950s.
February 28 – Lou Chiozza, 60, infielder-outfielder who appeared in 616 games from 1934 to 1939 for the Philadelphia Phillies and New York Giants; first player to bat in the major leagues' first night game on May 24, 1935, at Cincinnati.

March
March 2 – Johnny Podgajny, 50, pitcher in 115 games for the Philadelphia Phillies (1940–1943), Pittsburgh Pirates (1943) and Cleveland Indians (1946).
March 8 – Tripp Sigman, 72, outfielder who appeared in 62 games for the 1929–1930 Phillies.
March 10 – Bill James, 78, pitcher for the Boston Braves (1913–1915 and 1919); compiled a 26–7 won–lost record for the "Miracle Braves" of 1914 and won two games in the 1914 World Series, throwing 11 shutout innings, as Boston swept the Philadelphia Athletics.
March 11 – Clyde Barfoot, 79, pitcher for the St.Louis Cardinals (1922–1923) and Detroit Tigers (1926) who worked in 86 major league contests.
March 11 – Pelayo Chacón, 82, Cuban shortstop and manager in the Negro leagues whose playing career extended from 1908 to 1930.
March 16 – Ralph Birkofer, 62, left-handed pitcher who appeared in 132 games for the Pittsburgh Pirates and Brooklyn Dodgers from 1933 to 1937.
March 18 – Tony Welzer, 71, pitcher for the Boston Red Sox from 1926 to 1927, who was the first player born in Germany to appear in an American League game.
March 24 – Verlon Walker, 42, coach for the Chicago Cubs from 1961 until his death, and former minor-league catcher and manager; younger brother of Rube Walker.
March 31 – Sam Post, 74, first baseman who appeared in nine games for the 1922 Brooklyn Robins.

April
April 3 – Jack Boyle, 81, third baseman, shortstop and pinch hitter in 15 games for the 1912 Philadelphia Phillies.
April 4 – Carl Mays, 79, underhand pitcher who won 20 games five times with three teams, but was best remembered for his pitch which struck Ray Chapman in the head for the only field fatality in major league history.
April 9 – Elmer Eggert, 69, pitcher for the 1927 Boston Red Sox.
April 9 – Will Harridge, 87, president of the American League from 1931 to 1958.
April 12 – Ed Lafitte, 85, pitcher who worked in 33 games for the Detroit Tigers between 1909 and 1912, followed by 73 appearances for the Brooklyn Tip-Tops of the "outlaw" Federal League in 1914 and 1915.
April 15 – Mickey Harris, 54, All-Star pitcher who won 17 games for the 1946 Red Sox, led AL in saves with 1950 Senators.
April 16 – William Eckert, 62, Commissioner of Baseball from December 15, 1965 to February 3, 1969; retired United States Air Force general.
April 16 – Ron Northey, 50, outfielder with a powerful arm for five MLB teams between 1942 and 1957; hit a record three pinch-hit grand slams in his career.
April 19 – Russ Hodges, 60, broadcaster for the New York and San Francisco Giants from 1946 until his 1970 retirement; previously handled play-by-play for the Chicago Cubs and Chicago White Sox (1935–1938) and Washington Senators (1943–1945); also teamed with Mel Allen on New York Yankees' broadcasts from 1946 until the Bombers and Giants ended their joint radio/TV arrangement after the 1948 season; known for his legendary call of Bobby Thomson's pennant-winning home run during Game 3 of the 1951 National League tie-breaker series.
April 26 – Joe Agler, 83, first baseman who played 232 games of his 234-game MLB career in the short-lived Federal League, with Buffalo (1914–1915) and Baltimore (1915).

May
May 4 – Billy Mullen, 75, third baseman who appeared in 36 total games over five seasons for the St. Louis Browns (1920–1921 and 1928), Brooklyn Robins (1923) and Detroit Tigers (1926).
May 10 – Eddie Edmonson, 81, first baseman/outfielder in two games for 1913 Cleveland Naps.
May 12 – Heinie Manush, 69, Hall of Fame left fielder and career .330 hitter who won 1926 batting title with Detroit, led AL in hits and doubles twice each.
May 15 – Goose Goslin, 70, Hall of Fame left fielder who starred for five pennant winners in Washington and Detroit, batting .316 lifetime with eleven 100-RBI seasons; one of the first ten players to hit 200 home runs, he retired with the 7th-most RBIs in history.
May 20 – Martín Dihigo, 65, Cuban star in the Negro leagues who excelled at all positions, particularly as a pitcher and second baseman.
May 24 – Charlie Grover, 80, pitcher who worked in two games for the Detroit Tigers in September 1913.
May 24 – Rupert "Tommy" Thompson, 61, outfielder who appeared in 397 games for the Boston Braves, Chicago White Sox and St. Louis Browns.
May 26 – Judge Nagle, 91, pitched for the Pittsburgh Pirates and Boston Red Sox during the 1911 season.
May 27 – Jack Doscher, 90, left-handed pitcher for Chicago, Brooklyn and Cincinnati of the National League (1903–1906, 1908).

June
June 3 – Vern Spencer, 77, New York Giants outfielder who appeared in 45 games during the 1920 season.
June 8 – Ed Rile, 70, first baseman and pitcher whose career in the Negro leagues spanned 1918 to 1936; batted .306 lifetime in 454 games in the Negro National League.
June 19 – Gene Bremer, 54, All-Star pitcher of the Negro leagues between 1937 and 1948 who principally played for the Cleveland Buckeyes and Memphis Red Sox.
June 19 – Bert Graham, 85, first- and second-baseman (and pinch hitter) who got into eight games for the 1910 St. Louis Browns.
June 24 – Tom "Shaky" Kain, 63, longtime minor league manager and scout, influential to early career of Yogi Berra.

July
July 1 – Walt Kinney, 77, left-hander who pitched in 63 career games for the Boston Red Sox (1918) and Philadelphia Athletics (1919–1920 and 1923).
July 2 – Chester Emerson, 81, outfielder for the 1911–1912 Philadelphia Athletics.
July 2 – Frank Mack, 71, pitcher who appeared in 27 games over three seasons (1922–1923, 1925) for the White Sox.
July 7 – Ray Phelps, 67, pitcher in 126 games for the Brooklyn Robins and Dodgers (1930–1932) and Chicago White Sox (1935–1936).
July 8 – Ed Doherty, 71, longtime baseball executive and the first general manager of the expansion Washington Senators (1960–1962).
July 12 – Wally Judnich, 54, center fielder who twice batted .300 for the St. Louis Browns; backup outfielder for 1948 World Series champion Cleveland Indians.
July 12 – Ed Weiland, 56, pitcher who appeared in ten career games for the Chicago White Sox in 1940 and 1942.
July 16 – Earl McNeely, 73, outfielder and first baseman who played 683 games for the Washington Senators and St. Louis Browns between 1924 and 1931; his single that bounced over the head of New York Giants' third baseman Fred Lindstrom in the 12th inning of Game 7 won the 1924 World Series for Washington.
July 16 – Harry Pattee, 89, second baseman who played 80 games for the 1908 Brooklyn Superbas.
July 25 – John "Chief" Meyers, 90, catcher for New York Giants, Brooklyn Robins and Boston Braves (1909–1917); led National League catchers in put outs five straight seasons (1910–1914) and in on-base percentage (1912); batted .291 in 992 career games, enjoying three over-.300 campaigns.
July 28 – Myril Hoag, 63, outfielder for the New York Yankees, St. Louis Browns, Chicago White Sox and Cleveland Indians over 13 seasons between 1931 and 1945 who recovered from a brutal 1936 collision to become an All-Star three years later.

August
August 4 – Frank Lamanske, 64, left-handed pitcher who made two MLB appearances out of the bullpen for the 1935 Brooklyn Dodgers.
August 11 – Rusty Pence, 71, pitcher in four games for the 1921 Chicago White Sox.
August 12 – Shorty Dee, 81, Canadian-born  shortstop who played one game in the majors on September 14, 1915 as a member of the St. Louis Browns.
August 16 – Walter Mueller, 76, outfielder who played in 121 games for the Pittsburgh Pirates (1922–1924 and 1926); father of Don Mueller.
August 18 – Jim McCloskey, 61, southpaw who pitched in four contests for the 1936 Boston Bees.
August 24 – Mitch Chetkovich, 54, World War II-era pitcher for the 1945 Philadelphia Phillies who appeared in four early-season games.
August 27 – Bill Clarkson, 72, pitcher who appeared in 51 games for the New York Giants and Boston Braves between 1927 and 1929.

September
September 4 – Joe Hassler, 66, shortstop who played in 37 MLB games for the 1928 and 1929 Philadelphia Athletics and 1930 St. Louis Browns.
September 6 – Artie Dede, 76, catcher in one game for the 1916 Brooklyn Robins who became a longtime scout for the Brooklyn Dodgers and New York Yankees.
September 11 – Rube Melton, 54, pitcher who worked in 162 career games for the Philadelphia Phillies (1941–1942) and Brooklyn Dodgers (1943; 1946–1947).
September 14 – Bill Holden, 82, outfielder who played in 79 career games for the 1913–1914 New York Yankees and the 1914 Cincinnati Reds.
September 15 – Roberto Ortiz, 56, outfielder for the Washington Senators and Philadelphia Athletics who logged all or portions of six years in MLB between 1941 and 1950.
September 17 – Hack Miller, 77, outfielder who batted .323 in 349 career games, 334 of them for the Chicago Cubs of 1922–1925; played briefly for the 1916 Brooklyn Robins and 1918 Boston Red Sox.
September 20 – Tony Venzon, 56, National League umpire from 1957 until May 25, 1971, when he retired due to ill health; worked 2,226 league games, three World Series and three All-Star games.

October
October 7 – Les Barnhart, 66, pitcher who had two brief trials with the Cleveland Indians in 1928 and 1930.
October 8 – Murray Wall, 45, relief pitcher for the Boston Braves, Boston Red Sox and Washington Senators between 1950 and 1959.
October 14 – Doc Prothro, 78, licensed dentist; third baseman for the Senators (1920; 1923–1924), Red Sox (1925) and Cincinnati Reds (1926); manager of Philadelphia Phillies (1939–1941); influential minor league manager and club owner; father of Tommy Prothro.
October 16 – Dave Coble, 58, catcher who played in 15 games for 1939 Philadelphia Phillies.
October 17 – Mike Massey, 78, infielder in 31 games for the 1917 Boston Braves.
October 21 – William R. Daley, 79, principal owner of the Cleveland Indians (1956–1962) and Seattle Pilots (1969, their only year of existence).
October 23 – Jesse Petty, 76, left-handed pitcher who worked in 207 games for the Cleveland Indians (1921), Brooklyn Robins (1925–1928), Pittsburgh Pirates (1929–1930) and Chicago Cubs (1930).
October 23 – Woody Upchurch, 60, left-handed pitcher who appeared in ten games for the 1935–1936 Philadelphia Athletics.

November
November 4 – Logan Hensley, 71, ace pitcher for the St. Louis Stars of the Negro National League between 1922 and 1931; twice led NNL in games won (1926, 1930).
November 4 – Howard "Polly" McLarry, 80, infielder for the Chicago White Sox (1912) and Chicago Cubs (1915).
November 4 – Bud Messenger, 73, pitcher who won his only two decisions in five games pitched for the 1924 Cleveland Indians.
November 5 – Toothpick Sam Jones, 45, pitcher who began career in the Negro leagues and appeared in 322 MLB games, principally with the Chicago Cubs, St. Louis Cardinals and San Francisco Giants, over 12 seasons between 1951 and 1964; led National League in strikeouts (1955, 1956, 1958), games won (21 in 1959) and earned run average (2.83 in 1959); threw a no-hitter (1955) and a seven-inning no-no (1959, in a game shortened by rain); two-time NL All-Star.
November 5 – Joe Palmisano, 68, backup catcher who played in 19 games for the 1931 AL champion Philadelphia Athletics.
November 9 – Bill Dreesen, 67, third baseman who played 48 games for 1931 Boston Braves.
November 21 – Norm Branch, 56, relief pitcher who worked in 37 career games for 1941–1942 New York Yankees; member of 1941 World Series champions.
November 24 – Ed Fallenstein, 62, pitcher in 33 total games, 29 in relief, for 1931 Philadelphia Phillies and 1933 Boston Braves.
November – Ameal Brooks, 64, catcher/outfielder in the Negro leagues who played from 1928 to 1947.

December
December 4 – Walter Ockey, 51, relief pitcher who worked in two games in May 1944 for the wartime-era New York Giants.
December 12 – George Dunlop, 83, infielder who appeared briefly for 1913–1914 Cleveland Naps.
December 12 – Bill Kellogg, 87, first- and second baseman who appeared in 75 games for the 1914 Cincinnati Reds.
December 12 – Nip Winters, 72, standout Negro leagues left-hander of the 1920s who led the Eastern Colored League in games won for four consecutive seasons (1923–1926).
December 13 – Mike Ryba, 68, pitcher (in 240 games) and catcher (in ten games) who toiled for the St. Louis Cardinals (1935–1938) and Boston Red Sox (1941–1946); later a coach, minor league manager and longtime scout.
December 16 – Ferdie Schupp, 80, pitcher who won 21 games for the 1917 New York Giants but whose career faltered after service in World War I.
December 20 – Tom Fitzsimmons, 81, third baseman who got into four games for the 1919 Brooklyn Robins.
December 26 – Cliff Daringer, 86, infielder who appeared in 64 games for 1914 Kansas City Packers (Federal League).
December 30 – Tetelo Vargas, 65, Dominican All-Star outfielder who played in the Negro leagues between 1927 and 1944; batted .471 in 131 plate appearances for 1943 New York Cubans.

References

External links